Ranjita is a Bangladeshi film actress and producer. She appeared in 29 films and produced 18.

Biography
Ranjita's father was an official in the Ministry of Home Affairs.

Ranjita acted in popular film "Dhaka 86" in 1986 which was directed by veteran director Shafiqur Rahman and Bapparaj was the Hero of this film. She also acted in Jiner Badsha in 1989 directed by Abdur Razzak.

Filmography
 Dhaka 86 (1986)
 Raja Mistri
 Jiner Badsha (1989)
 Maran Bukhay
 Zulumbaaz
 Karate Master
 Premik Rangbaaz
 Kung Fu Kanya
 Marana Larai
 "Neel Noksha

References

Living people
Bangladeshi film actresses
Year of birth missing (living people)